Skerne is the name of various locations:

Haughton-le-Skerne - Darlington, County Durham, England
Preston-le-Skerne, by the river in Co. Durham
Skerne, East Riding of Yorkshire - England
River Skerne - County Durham, England